George Frederick Shone (15 February 1922 – September 2009) was an English footballer, who played as a centre forward in the Football League for Tranmere Rovers.

References

Tranmere Rovers F.C. players
Association football forwards
English Football League players
1922 births
2009 deaths
Sportspeople from Runcorn
English footballers